Jonathan M. "Joffa" Smith (1 February 1967 – 26 June 2010) was a British games programmer, best known for his titles for the ZX Spectrum. His games were notable for containing a large number of sprites and parallax scrolling, features which were largely unknown on the Spectrum at the time.

His most notable games include Cobra, (which was a license extremely loosely based on a Sylvester Stallone film) one of the first Spectrum games to exhibit full-colour parallax scrolling and his conversion of the arcade game Green Beret. A notable "trademark" of Smith's was his habit of writing his name (with "Jonathan" and "Smith" spelled various ways) as a mirror-image in his games.

Notable releases

References

External links
 An interview conducted by ZX Specticle
 An interview at The Spectrum Golden Years
 Another interview
 
 Obituary on World of Spectrum

Video game programmers
British computer programmers
2010 deaths
1967 births